Dinwiddie County Court House is a historic courthouse building located at the junction of U.S. 1 and VA 619 in Dinwiddie, Dinwiddie County, Virginia. It was built in 1851, and is a two-story, brick temple-form building in the Greek Revival style. The courthouse was the site of the Battle of Dinwiddie Court House in the closing stages of the American Civil War. The Dinwiddie County Historical Society is currently located in this building.

It was listed on the National Register of Historic Places in 1973.

References

External links

Courthouses on the National Register of Historic Places in Virginia
National Register of Historic Places in Dinwiddie County, Virginia
County courthouses in Virginia
Greek Revival architecture in Virginia
Buildings and structures in Dinwiddie County, Virginia
Government buildings completed in 1851
Museums in Dinwiddie County, Virginia
History museums in Virginia
1851 establishments in Virginia